Idgah may refer to:

 Eidgah, an open-air enclosure reserved for Eid prayers 
 Idgah (short story), by Premchand
Idgah, Uttar Pradesh, a neighbourhood in Agra
Id Gah Mosque, in Kabul, Afghanistan
Id Kah Mosque, in Kashgar, Xinjiang, China
 Idgah railway station, southwest of Agra, Uttar Pradesh
 Idgah Bus Stand, in Agra, Uttar Pradesh